Henrietta Street is a Dublin street, to the north of Bolton Street on the north side of the city, first laid out and developed by Luke Gardiner during the 1720s. A very wide street relative to streets in other 18th-century cities, it includes a number of very large red-brick city palaces of Georgian design.

Name

The street is generally held to be named after Henrietta (née Somerset; 1690–1726), the wife of Charles FitzRoy, 2nd Duke of Grafton, although an alternative candidate is Henrietta (née Crofts; 1697–1730), third wife of Charles Paulet, 2nd Duke of Bolton. The nearby Bolton Street is named after Paulet.

History
Henrietta Street is the earliest Georgian Street in Dublin, and at the forefront of Dublin's later Georgian streetscapes. Construction on the street started in the mid-1720s, on land bought by the Gardiner family in 1721. Construction was still taking place in the 1750s. Gardiner had a mansion, designed by Richard Cassels, built for his own use around 1730.

The street was popularly referred to as Primate's Hill, as one of the houses was owned by the Archbishop of Armagh, although this house, along with two others, was demolished to make way for the Law Library of King's Inns.

The street fell into disrepair during the 19th and 20th centuries, with the houses being used as tenements. While the houses on Henrietta Street had been home to a small number of wealthy residents in the 18th century, these were given-over to tenement use during the 19th century, and by 1911 there were 835 people living in poverty in just 15 houses. A number of houses on the street remained in use as tenements until the 1970s. In the late 20th and early 21st centuries, the street has been subject to restoration efforts.

The street has been used as a period-location for film and TV companies, with productions filmed including Albert Nobbs, Inspector George Gently and Foyle's War.

The street is a cul-de-sac, with the Law Library of King's Inns facing onto its western end. As of 2017, there are 13 houses on the street. One of these houses, 14 Henrietta Street, was opened as a museum in late 2018. 14 Henrietta Street tells the story of the building and of the lives of the people who lived there.

First residents
The street was initially popular with landed and merchant families, and a number of hereditary peers had properties on the street in the mid-18th century. The houses were built to have rear gardens and mews.

North-side

 No.3
 Resident: Owen Wynne; 
 No.4
 Construction: Built after 1755
 Resident: John Maxwell, 1st Baron Farnham from 1757, father-in-law of Owen Wynne at no.3. This house remained in the possession of the same family until 1852. 
 No.5
 Construction: Built by Nathaniel Clements about 1741 for Henry O'Brien
 Resident: Henry O'Brien, 8th Earl of Thomond. Thomond died 2 years later and the house was occupied by George Stone, Bishop of Ferns, who later succeeded Boulter as Primate;
 No.6
 Construction: Separate flat within No. 5; 
 No.7
 Construction: Built by Nathaniel Clements about 1738
 Resident: Nathaniel Clements;
 No.8
 Construction: Nathaniel Clements 1735
 Resident: Lieutenant General Richard St George;
 No.9

 Construction: Designed by Edward Lovett Pearce and built for Luke Gardiner by 1735
 Resident Thomas Carter;
 No.10
 Construction: Edward Lovett Pearce was the architect
 Resident: Luke Gardiner

Western end
 Entrance to King's Inns

South-side
 King's Inns law library

 No.11
 Construction: Designed by Edward Lovett Pearce for Luke Gardiner (built as a pair to No. 12)
 Resident: Brigadier General William Graham;
 No.12
 Construction: Built as a pair to No. 11 for Gardiner with Edward Lovett Pearce as architect
 Resident: William Stewart, 3rd Viscount Mountjoy and later 1st Earl of Blessington;
 No.13
 Construction: Built by Luke Gardiner at the same time as numbers 14 and 15
 Resident: Nicholas Loftus, 1st Earl of Ely from 1755 (1st record);
 No.14
 Construction: Built by Luke Gardiner at the same time as numbers 13 and 15
 Resident: Richard 3rd Viscount Molesworth from 1752. 
 Other notable occupant: No. 14 is now a museum.
 No.15
 Construction: Built by Luke Gardiner at the same time as numbers 13 and 14
 Resident: Sir Robert King from about 1748
 Other notable occupant: Na Píobairí Uilleann

See also
 Georgian Dublin
 List of streets and squares in Dublin

Further reading 

 Murdoch, Tessa (ed.) (2022). Great Irish Households: Inventories from the Long Eighteenth Century. Cambridge: John Adamson, inventory of No. 10 Henrietta Street in 1772, when in the ownership of Luke Gardiner, the younger (1745–1798), later 1st Viscount Mountjoy, pp. 157–61

References

Georgian architecture in Ireland
Streets in Dublin (city)
Tourist attractions in Dublin (city)